Amanda Dawn Clapham is a British actress, known for portraying the role of Holly Cunningham on the Channel 4 soap opera Hollyoaks.

Career
Clapham joined the Channel 4 soap opera Hollyoaks in 2013 as Holly Cunningham. Her storylines included in the programme included: a relationship with Jason Roscoe, played by  Alfie Browne-Sykes, an affair with his brother, Robbie Roscoe, played by Charlie Wernham, a drunk driving accident that killed Rachel Hardy, taking drugs, and a relationship with Nathan Nightingale. Clapham opted to leave the show in 2018 and Holly departed in September. She returned briefly in January 2019. In August 2020, she appeared in an episode of the BBC medical drama Casualty as Claudie Tullet.

References

External links
 

Actresses from Manchester
English soap opera actresses
Living people
Year of birth missing (living people)